VTT may refer to:

 VTT Technical Research Centre of Finland
 Vacuum Tower Telescope, on Tenerife in the Canary Islands 
 Vancouver Talmud Torah, school in Vancouver, British Columbia
 Vélo tout terrain, the French term for a Mountain bike
 Virtual tabletop for boardgames and role-playing games
 WebVTT, timed text file format

See also
 .vtt, file format